Charles T. Beardsley Jr. (1861–1937) was an American architect practicing in Bridgeport, Connecticut.

Beardsley was born in Derby, Connecticut in 1861. At the age of 15 he went to New Haven, where he took a position in the office of Henry Austin. After nearly a decade had gone by, Beardsley relocated to Bridgeport in 1885, where he established his own office. He initially became noted as a designer of private residences, though in the 1890s he added the design of schools to his repertoire.

During the first 15 years or so of his professional career, Beardsley preferred the Queen Anne, Richardsonian Romanesque, and Shingle Styles. In later years, he adapted to the Colonial and Tudor revivals.

At least one of Beardsley's works is listed independently on the National Register of Historic Places, and many others are contributing resources to listed historic districts.

Architectural work

 1886 – Eli Dewhurst House, 409 Noble Ave, Bridgeport, Connecticut
 1887 – Frederick J. Lockwood Duplex, 234–236 West Ave, Bridgeport, Connecticut
 1888 – James A. McAvoy Duplex, 63 Maple Ave, Willimantic, Connecticut
 1888 – Isabelle Nash House, 586 Clinton Ave, Bridgeport, Connecticut
 1889 – Arthur R. Carpenter House, 156 Prospect St, Willimantic, Connecticut
 1890 – Edwin J. Nettleton Houses, 77–93 William St, Bridgeport, Connecticut
 1890 – Edwin J. Nettleton Houses, 311-321 E Washington Ave, Bridgeport, Connecticut
 1891 – Frank M. Wilson House, 196 Church St, Willimantic, Connecticut
 1892 – Willimantic State Normal School, Valley St, Willimantic, Connecticut
 Not completed until 1895. Burned in 1943.
 1893 – Mrs. Frederick J. Lockwood House, 298 Prospect St, Bridgeport, Connecticut
 1894 – Masonic Building, 1007 Broad St, Bridgeport, Connecticut
 Demolished.
 1894 – Plumb Memorial Library, 65 Wooster St, Shelton, Connecticut
 1896 – William H. Siebs House, 158 Brooklawn Ave, Bridgeport, Connecticut
 1899 – Albert H. Canfield House, 116 Elmwood Pl, Bridgeport, Connecticut
 1900 – Hamilton S. Shelton House, 1464 Fairfield Ave, Bridgeport, Connecticut
 Demolished.
 1905 – Newfield School, 405 Newfield Ave, Bridgeport, Connecticut
 1909 – Jesse B. Cornwall House, 625 Clinton Ave, Bridgeport, Connecticut
 1910 – Garfield School, 655 Stillman St, Bridgeport, Connecticut
 1911 – Bryant School, 230 Poplar St, Bridgeport, Connecticut
 1911 – Lafayette School, 54 Grove St, Shelton, Connecticut
 1912 – Wakeman Memorial Building, 648 Harbor Rd, Southport, Connecticut

References

1861 births
1937 deaths
19th-century American architects
Architects from Connecticut
Architects from Bridgeport, Connecticut
People from Derby, Connecticut
20th-century American architects